Clue cells are epithelial cells of the vagina that get their distinctive stippled appearance by being covered with bacteria. The etymology behind the term "clue" cell derives from the original research article from Gardner and Dukes describing the characteristic cells. The name was chosen for its brevity in describing the sine qua non of bacterial vaginosis.

They are a medical sign of bacterial vaginosis, particularly that caused by Gardnerella vaginalis, a group of Gram-variable bacteria. This bacterial infection is characterized by a foul, fishy smelling, thin gray vaginal discharge, and an increase in vaginal pH from around 4.5 to over 5.5.

References

External links
 Overview at WebMD
 Clue cell in Gram stain  at Fun With Microbiology
 Clue cell in Papanicolaou stain at the http://eknygos.lsmuni.lt/

Epithelial cells